D. Billy Jones is the Assembly member for the 115th District of the New York State Assembly. He is a Democrat. The district includes Clinton and Franklin counties as well as a portion of St. Lawrence County.

Life and career
Jones is a lifelong resident of the North Country, growing up on a dairy farm.  Following high school, Jones began work as a corrections officer with the New York Department of Corrections, where he worked for nearly twenty years. Jones has one daughter.

First elected to public office in 2009, Jones first served as Mayor of Chateaugay, New York for four years and was elected to the Franklin County Legislature in 2010. He served as the Chairman of the legislature in from 2013 to 2016.

New York State Assembly
In 2016, Republican Assemblymember Janet Duprey announced that she would not seek re-election, opening up a possibly competitive seat.  Jones was recruited by the Democratic caucus, and decided ultimately to jump into the race. Facing Republican Kevin A. Mulverhill in the general election, Jones won by a 52% to 48% margin. He was the first Democrat to represent Clinton County in the state legislature in over half a century.

Jones was sworn in for his first term on January 1, 2017. With no opponent in the race, he ran unopposed and was reelected in 2018 for a second term.

References

External links
New York State Assemblyman Billy Jones official site

Living people
Mayors of places in New York (state)
Democratic Party members of the New York State Assembly
21st-century American politicians
County legislators in New York (state)
People from Chateaugay, New York
1974 births